, also known in short as Akasaka, is a Japanese adult visual novel developed by Feng and first released for Windows as a DVD on July 27, 2007. A version without adult content was released under the title Akaneiro ni Somaru Saka: Parallel on July 31, 2008, by GN Software for the PlayStation 2. A port of this version of the game was released for the PlayStation Portable on December 17, 2009, under the title Akaneiro ni Somaru Saka: Portable. The gameplay in Akaneiro ni Somaru Saka follows a plot line which offers pre-determined scenarios with courses of interaction, and focuses on the appeal of the six female main characters. Two light novels were produced in December 2007 and February 2008 written by different authors, and an Internet radio show began in April 2008. A manga adaptation began serialization in Kadokawa Shoten's seinen magazine Comp Ace on June 26, 2008, illustrated by Homare Sakazuki. An anime adaptation produced by TNK and directed by Keitaro Motonaga aired in Japan between October and December 2008.

Gameplay

Akaneiro ni Somaru Saka'''s gameplay requires little interaction from the player as most of the duration of the game is spent simply reading the text that appears on the screen which represents either dialogue between the various characters or the inner thoughts of the protagonist. Every so often, the player will come to a point where he or she is given the chance to choose from multiple options. The time between these points is variable and can occur anywhere from a minute to much longer. Gameplay pauses at these points and depending on which choice the player makes, the plot will progress in a specific direction. In the original version, there are six main plot lines that the player will have the chance to experience, one for each of the heroines in the story. This number increases to seven with the PlayStation 2 version. To view all the plot lines, the player will have to replay the game multiple times and make different decisions to progress the plot in an alternate direction. One of the goals of the gameplay from the PC version is for the player to enable the viewing of sex scenes depicting the protagonist, Jun'ichi, and one of the six heroines having sex.

Plot
Jun'ichi Nagase attends a prestigious high school. He has the nickname Geno Killer since he was rebellious in middle school. This is used, inadvertently, to help a girl named Yuuhi Katagiri from trouble. She later transfers to his school. Jun'ichi then kisses her due to a misunderstanding. Outraged, because he stole her first kiss and embarrassed her, she screams at him. Subsequently, it turns out that Yuuhi is his fiancée as arranged by their parents. Their parents discuss the matter and order them to go out together for a month to restore their relationship. If their relationship does not get better, the engagement will then be cancelled.

Characters

 (anime)
Jun'ichi is the main protagonist of the series and is a second year high school student. He had a reputation of a delinquent in junior high school until his sister, Minato, decided to move in with him. He has a snarky attitude and is often teased by everyone around him, including his teacher. His life takes a drastic turn when Yuuhi Katagiri enters his life. They first meet when he saves her from some delinquents who were bothering her. The following day she is introduced as a transfer student to his class. Due to a misunderstanding, he kisses her in front of the class causing her opinion of Jun'ichi to sour. This is further exacerbated when it turns out that their families have arranged their marriage. Despite this rough start, Jun'ichi finds himself protecting Yuuhi when she is harassed and, as time progresses, their feelings for one another begin to grow even though neither of them will admit it. Throughout the anime series it is hinted that Jun'ichi has romantic feelings for his sister, Minato, but is reluctant to admit this even though he sometimes has fantasies about her. In the final episode, he realizes that he cannot live without Minato and confesses to her. In the manga however, he and Yuuhi end up together, as he also has feelings for her.

 (PC), Rie Kugimiya (anime/PS2)
Yuuhi is the main heroine in the series. She is very beautiful, which often causes trouble for her, since it draws unwanted attention from passersby - usually men. One day, when she was being harassed by two men, she was saved by Jun'ichi. The next day she transfers to his school (and his class) hoping meet her fiancé because she heard that he was in this area. Later, after a misunderstanding on Jun'ichi's part, he kisses her in public, causing her to have ill feelings towards him. Throughout the series her feelings for him grow. In the manga she and Jun'ichi end up together.

 (PC), Aya Hirano (anime/PS2)
Minato is Jun'ichi's younger sister and attends the same school that he does as a first year high school student. She is capable in all areas of household related work and is proud of it. She also has unique abilities, like listening to the ground to detect the presence of animals, as well as be able to communicate with them. She has feelings for Jun'ichi. She mentions that she was adopted once, but later says it was a joke. In the PC game Minato is blood-related to Jun'ichi but in the PS2 version she is not related to him, and it is implied that she is not blood-related to Jun'ichi in the anime. In the anime version she ends up with Jun'ichi; in the manga however, he doesn't reciprocate her feelings, and ends up with Yuuhi.

 (PC), Marina Inoue (anime/PS2)
Tsukasa is a second year student in the same class as Jun'ichi, and is a childhood friend. She is a member of the News club. She has a lively personality and loves to gossip as well as tease Jun'ichi.

 (PC), Ryō Hirohashi (anime/PS2)
A first year high school student in the same class as Minato. She has an air of mystery around her, strongly hinted of being an alien, and can be found just about anywhere at the right time.

 (PC), Rie Tanaka (anime/PS2)
Mitsuki Shiina is the president of the student council. She is a third year student and very popular among the student body. She likes to use Jun'ichi as her lapdog getting him to do favors for her or perform activities for the student body.

 (PC), Erino Hazuki (anime/PS2)
Mikoto is a third year high school student in the same class as Mitsuki. She has an individual route which is not available at the beginning of the PC game.

 (anime/PS2)
Karen is a second year student that is in the same class as Jun'ichi. She is an original character that was first introduced in Parallel. She comes from a very rich family like Yuuhi and prides herself on acting like a lady. She becomes best friends with Yuuhi. She eventually admits to falling in love with Jun'ichi.

 (PC), Akira Ishida (anime/PS2)
Nishino is Jun'ichi's best friend and is also a second year student in the same class as Jun'ichi. He is full of strange ideas that often get Jun'ichi into trouble, and is very close to Tsukasa being in very much the same line of thinking with her. He is the vice-president of the student council.

 (PC), Rikiya Koyama (anime/PS2)
Jun'ichi's teacher. While strict with regards to academics, he has a rather eccentric personality, especially towards Jun'ichi.

 (PC), Kaori Fukuhara (anime/PS2)
She is the secretary and treasurer of the student council.

 (PC), Ryō Hirohashi (anime/PS2)
She is the younger sister of Nagomi.

 (PC), Yū Kobayashi (anime/PS2)

DevelopmentAkaneiro ni Somaru Saka is the fifth project developed by the visual novel studio Feng, and is similar to their fourth title Aozora no Mieru Oka. The producer for the game is Uezama. The project uses four different artists in character design: Tsubasu Izumi (designer of Yuuhi, Mitsuki, and Mikoto), Ryohka (designer of Minato and Nagomi), Naturalton (designer of Tsukasa), and Akira Sawano (designer of the protagonist, and the supporting cast). The scenario was entirely written by Kenji Saitō. For the PlayStation 2 version, an additional heroine named Karen Ayanokōji was included and is designed by Manabu Aoi.

Release history
On July 23, 2007, a free game demo of Akaneiro ni Somaru Saka became available for download at Feng's official website. In the demo, the player was introduced to the main characters in the game through a sequence that is typical of the gameplay found in a visual novel which includes times during gameplay where the player is given several choices to make in order to further the plot in a specific direction. The full game was first released on July 27, 2007, as a DVD playable only on a Microsoft Windows PC, containing full voice acting with the exception of Jun'ichi. A PlayStation 2 version without adult content was released on July 31, 2008, by GN Software under the title .

Adaptations

Books
Two light novels have been produced. The first, published on December 15, 2007, by Harvest, is written by Mutsuki Mizusaki and illustrated by Akira Sawano. The second, published on February 29, 2008, by Kill Time Communication, is written by Mao Shinji, the front cover is illustrated by Ryohka, and the inside has illustrations by Piēru Yoshio. An art book for the visual novel called  was published on February 29, 2008, by Broccoli.

Internet radio show
An Internet radio show to promote the Akaneiro ni Somaru Saka: Parallel called  began broadcasting on April 2, 2008, and is distributed on Nico Radio. The show is streamed online every Thursday, and is hosted by Rikiya Koyama and Ryō Hirohashi who voice Seijirō Sugishita and Nagomi Shiraishi from the visual novel. There are seven corners, or parts, to the show that each episode is divided into. Several voice actors from the visual novel have appeared on the show as guests who include Erino Hazuki (as Mikoto), Marina Inoue (as Tsukasa), Miyuki Hashimoto, Emiri Katō (as Karen), and Kaori Fukuhara (as Aya).

Manga
A manga adaptation began serialization in Kadokawa Shoten's seinen magazine Comp Ace on June 26, 2008. The story is based on the visual novel that preceded it, and is illustrated by Homare Sakazuki.

Anime

An anime adaptation produced by animation studio TNK, directed by Keitaro Motonaga, and written by Makoto Uezu aired in Japan on Chiba TV between October 2 and December 18, 2008. The anime's opening theme, is performed by Miyuki Hashimoto and the ending theme, "Sweet Gift", is performed by Rie Kugimiya. A second ending theme performed by Ryō Hirohashi, "Confusion...", is used for episode three. TNK made a mistake in the credits for "Hatsukoi Parachute" and named it "Ren'ai Parachute" instead. An additional original video animation episode was released on June 26, 2009, with the seventh and final DVD compilation volume. Anime licensor Sentai Filmworks has licensed the series along with the OVA and release the complete collection on March 8, 2011.

Music
The PC version of the visual novel has two main theme songs, one opening theme and one ending theme. The opening theme, is sung by Miyuki Hashimoto, written by Aki Hata, composed by Akiko Tomita, and arranged by Junpei Fujita. The ending theme, is sung by Chiki-chan, written by Hata, and is composed and arranged by Yūichi Nakano. The PC game's original soundtrack called Gradation!'' was released by Lantis on October 31, 2008, containing two discs.

References

External links
PC visual novel official website 
PS2 visual novel official website  
Anime official website 

2007 Japanese novels
2007 video games
2008 anime television series debuts
2008 Japanese novels
2008 manga
2009 anime OVAs
Bishōjo games
Eroge
Japan-exclusive video games
Kadokawa Shoten manga
Lantis (company)
Light novels
PlayStation 2 games
Seinen manga
Sentai Filmworks
Television shows written by Makoto Uezu
TNK (company)
Video games developed in Japan
Visual novels
Windows games